The 2017 Brabantse Pijl was a one-day road cycling race that took place on 12 April 2017. It was the 57th edition of the Brabantse Pijl and was rated as a 1.HC event as part of the 2017 UCI Europe Tour.

Teams
Twenty-four teams were invited to take part in the race. These included nine UCI WorldTeams and fifteen UCI Continental Circuits#UCI Professional Continental teams.

Result

References

External links

2017 UCI Europe Tour
2017 in Belgian sport
2017